Băile Olănești is a town located in Vâlcea County, Romania. The town administers eight villages: Cheia, Comanca, Gurguiata, Livadia, Mosoroasa, Olănești, Pietrișu, and Tisa. It is situated in the historical region of Oltenia.

It lies on the banks of the Olănești River, in the hilly area south of the Parâng Mountains. Part of the Buila-Vânturarița National Park is situated on the territory of the town.

History
The first documentary attestation of Olănești dates from 1527. The mineral waters of Olănești are mentioned for the first time in a 1760 charter and are called healing waters. In 1873 Olănești mineral waters are sent to the Vienna Exhibition, obtaining the Golden Medal.

Notable people
 Constantin Pîrvulescu (1895–1992), communist politician, one of the founders of the Romanian Communist Party.
 Iulian Șerban (1985–2021), paracanoeist.

References

External links
 360 Virtual Tour of Băile Olănești - winter 2010

Populated places in Vâlcea County
Towns in Romania
Spa towns in Romania
Localities in Oltenia